Greg Leffler (born December 27, 1951), is a former driver in the CART Championship Car series. He raced in the 1980-1983 seasons, with 13 career starts, including the 1980 Indianapolis 500. He finished in the top ten twice, with his best finish in 6th position in 1982 at Riverside. In 1979, Leffler was the USAC Sprint Car National Series Champion.

He lives in Churubusco, Indiana.

External links

1951 births
Indianapolis 500 drivers
Living people
People from Randolph County, Indiana
Racing drivers from Indiana
Racing drivers from Indianapolis
USAC Silver Crown Series drivers